The final of the Women's 100 metres butterfly event at the European LC Championships 1997 was held on Friday 1997-08-22 in Seville, Spain.

Finals

Qualifying heats

See also
1996 Women's Olympic Games 100m Butterfly
1997 Women's World Championships (SC) 100m Butterfly

References
 scmsom results

B
Women's 100 metre butterfly
1997 in women's swimming